Gaylen Richard Pitts (born June 6, 1946) is an American professional baseball manager and baseball coach, and a former third baseman at the Major League Baseball level.

Playing career (1964–77)
As a player, Pitts threw and batted right-handed, stood 6'1" (1.85 m) tall and weighed 175 pounds (79 kg). The following season, he was acquired by Oakland in a minor league transaction.

Pitts' Major League experience came with the Oakland Athletics during brief call-ups during the 1974 and 1975 seasons. He appeared in 28 games, batted 44 times, and compiled a batting average of .250, with four doubles and four runs batted in.  However, Pitts has spent most of his career in the Cardinals' organization.

Coaching and managing career (1978–present)
Pitts' managing career began with two seasons (–) in the A's farm system managing the Modesto A's. He returned to the Cardinals in 1981 as a minor league manager and has spent most of his career with the club. He guided Springfield to division titles in 1986 and 1987 and Arkansas to a league championship in 1989, earning him Texas League Manager of the Year honors.

Pitts' first five years coaching for the Major League club occurred from (1991 to 95) on Joe Torre's staff when Torre was the manager of the Redbirds.  His coaching roles included hitting (1991), bullpen (1992 St. Louis Cardinals season), bench coach in 1995.

Perhaps his greatest accomplishment was winning the  Pacific Coast League Championship as manager of the Triple A St. Louis Cardinals affiliate, the Memphis Redbirds. In extra innings, Albert Pujols who was at the time 20 years old, hit a walk-off home run to win the title.

During his most recent managerial assignment, he was the  manager of the Palm Beach Cardinals, St. Louis' High-A affiliate in the Florida State League.  He opened the  season as the Cards' special assistant for player development and served in that role until joining Matheny's staff.

Personal life
With his wife Julia and son Travis Ray, Pitts resides in Mountain Home, Arkansas.  His hobbies include skiing, racquetball and trout fishing.

See also
 List of St. Louis Cardinals coaches

References

Major League Baseball bench coaches
Major League Baseball third basemen
Baseball players from Wichita, Kansas
Major League Baseball third base coaches
Oakland Athletics players
St. Louis Cardinals coaches
St. Petersburg Cardinals players
Cedar Rapids Cardinals players
Modesto Reds players
Arkansas Travelers players
Tulsa Oilers (baseball) players
San Jose Missions players
Wichita Aeros players
Iowa Oaks players
Tucson Toros players
Living people
1946 births
Louisville Redbirds managers
Memphis Redbirds managers